Army General Vladimir Sergeyevich Mikhaylov (born October 6, 1943) is a former Commander-in-Chief of the Russian Air Force.

Biography 
Born in Kudinovo, Moscow oblast, Vladimir Mikhailov was educated at a local Machinery vocational school (1962),  (gold degree, 1966), and between 1966 and 1975 he served in a Taganrog-based air force regiment, with extramural courses at Gagarin Air Force Academy (1975).

Career 
In 1991, he earned a degree at the General Staff Academy and was assigned to the North Caucasus Military District as Air Force component commander, Air army commander.

In 1998, he assumed the office of deputy Air Force Commander-in-Chief.

In 2002 he was promoted to the post of the Commander-in-Chief of the Russian Air Force. He has the title Hero of the Russian Federation. On May 9, 2007, Mikhaylov resigned from office due to his age.

Orders and decorations 
Among numerous orders and decorations General of the Army Vladimir Sergeyevich Mikhaylov was awarded:
Hero of the Russian Federation (1996)
Order for Service to the Homeland in the Armed Forces of the USSR 3rd class (1982)
Order "For Personal Courage" (1994)
Order of Military Merit (Russia) (1985)
Honoured Military Pilot of the USSR
Honorary citizen of Yeysk (1998)
Honorary citizen of Borisoglebsk (2000)
Honorary citizen of Noginsky District (2014)
Badge of honour of the governor of the Tver Oblast (Cross of the Holy Michael of Tver in 2004)

References 

1943 births
Living people
People from Noginsky District
Commanders-in-chief of the Russian Air Force
Heroes of the Russian Federation
Russian Air Force generals
Soviet Air Force officers
Generals of the army (Russia)
Military Academy of the General Staff of the Armed Forces of Russia alumni